The  Thomas W. Clyde  is a Chesapeake Bay skipjack, normally ported at Deal Island, Maryland. Built at Oriole, Maryland in 1911, the Clyde is one of nineteen surviving skipjacks built before 1912.

She was listed on the National Register of Historic Places in 1985. She is assigned Maryland dredge number 39.

References

External links
, including photo in 1983, at Maryland Historical Trust

Somerset County, Maryland
Skipjacks
Ships on the National Register of Historic Places in Maryland
1911 ships
National Register of Historic Places in Somerset County, Maryland